Verona School is a historic public school building located at Verona, Augusta County, Virginia. It was built in 1911, as a three-room, frame schoolhouse in the manner of a common I-house design.  The school closed by the late 1940s, and around 1956–1957, was moved back from the road and converted to an office and manager's residence for a neighboring motel.

It was listed on the National Register of Historic Places in 1985.

References

School buildings on the National Register of Historic Places in Virginia
School buildings completed in 1911
Schools in Augusta County, Virginia
National Register of Historic Places in Augusta County, Virginia
1911 establishments in Virginia